Ossemsley is an extended hamlet in the New Forest National Park of Hampshire, England. It lies close to the village of Bashley. The nearest town is New Milton, which lies approximately 1.7 miles (2.4 km) to the south.

History
The name Ossemsley probably means "Osmund's wood/clearing". An estate called "Oselei" appears twice in the Domesday Book, but it is listed with places in the Boldre area, so it is thought unlikely to refer to Ossemsley. In 1670 Thomas Stevens is known to have been in possession of "Osmondsley".

Ossemsley has never developed into a village, and today it is a scatter of houses in a mix of farmland and woodland. Ossemsley Manor House changed hands a few times during the 19th century before being rebuilt in 1908   for Sir Alfred Cooper (1846-1915). Ossemsley Manor was one of the houses in which Siegfried Sassoon's wife, Hester Gatty, spent her childhood. Sassoon himself is known to have visited Ossemsley Manor in the 1930s. In the lead up to the D-Day invasion of 1944, the battalion of the 2nd Glosters were stationed (in tents) at Ossemsley manor. It is also reported that there was a prisoner-of-war camp at Ossemsley, but its precise location is not certain.

The manor house was later sold to Harold Walker, chairman of Bournemouth Football Club. The manor house earned some notoriety in the 1960s and 70s as a country club run by the professional golfer Bunny Millward. The house has since been sold and subdivided into flats.

References

Hamlets in Hampshire